Radio 1 is a public radio station in Accra, the capital town of the Greater Accra Region of Ghana. The station is owned and run by the state broadcaster - the Ghana Broadcasting Corporation (GBC). The station is one of two national stations run by GBC. The station broadcasts in English and other Ghanaian languages including Akan, Dagbani, Ewe, Ga, Hausa and Nzema.

References

Radio stations in Ghana
Greater Accra Region
Mass media in Accra